The Cory Library for Humanities Research, formerly The Cory Library for Historical Research, is a research library at Rhodes University, and is one of the branch libraries of the Rhodes University Library services. In addition to its preservation Eastern Cape history, it also contains the archives of the Methodist Church of Southern Africa.

The library is named after Sir George Cory, chemist and historian, author of the six-volume "The Rise of South Africa". The Cory Library for Historical Research was established in 1933, with the donation of Cory's Africana collection to Rhodes University

See also 

 Rhodes University Library
 Xhosa Wars

References 

Rhodes University
Libraries in Makhanda, Eastern Cape
Academic libraries in South Africa